Basantpur may refer to:

Basantpur, Bara, town and village development community in Nepal
Basantpur, Pachperwa, village development in Balrampur district, Uttar Pradesh
Basantpur, Parsa, village development community in Nepal
Basantpur (community development block), Siwan, a block in Bihar, India
Basantpur, Siwan (Vidhan Sabha constituency) - in Bihar, India

Basantpur, Sohaon, village in Uttar Pradesh, India